Hagestedgaard is a manor house and estate located at the village of Hagested, near Holbæk, Holbæk Municipality, some 60 kilometres west of Copenhagen, Denmark.  The estate traces its history back to the 13th century but the current asymmetrical complex of single-storey, white-washed buildings surrounding a central courtyard was constructed for Hans Didrik Brinck-Seidelin in 1747 with the exception of the remains of a tower built by Johan Friis in 1555. The estate has been owned by members of the Castenskiold family since 1769.

History

Middle Ages
 
Hagestedgård is first mentioned in the Danish Census Book from  1230 when it was owned by the Crown and known as "Hakastæthe", It is only mentioned sporadically during the following centuries but the estate probably served as a fief. Vassals included Peder Jensen Pilegrim in 1347, Markvard Tiinhuus in 1502 and Otte Tiinhuus in 1521 and 1540.

In 1540, Hagestedgaard  was granted to chancellor Johan Friis in exchange for property in Odsherred and the estate was at the same time expanded with land from the shut-down village of Orderup. Friis was for many years one of the most influential men in the country.

Through marriage, the estate was transferred from the Friis family to the Huitfeldts. It was later passed on to Henrik Thott through his marriage to a daughter of Henrik Huitfeldt. The ravages and looting of Swedish troops during the Dano-Swedish War economically ruined Thott.

1658–1704: Thomas and Caspar Bartholin
In 1663, Thott had to sell Hagestedgård to Thomas Bartholin. Bartholin, who was just 44 years old at the time, retired from the university and settled on the estate. The main building, rectory and eight farmhouses were destroyed by fire in 1670. Bartholin's vast library and many of his works were lost. As compensation, Christian V granted him tax exemption, contributed with building materials for the rebuilding of the house and appointed him as court physician.

Bartholin's son Caspar Bartholin took over the estate after his father's death.  He sold the estate to Laurits Jacobsen in 1575 but reacquired it in 1695.

1704–1740: Changing owners
Bartholin then sold Hagestedgaard, for a second time, to Ursula von Putbus in 1704. She had become a widow after just one and a half years of marriage to the nobleman Knud Thott in October 1702. Ole Bornamann (1673-1725), a district judge of Zealand and Møn and  the owner of Nørager at Kalundborg, purchased the estate in 1709. Peder Benzon, another district judge, acquired the estate in 1712. He purchased Gjeddesdal from his brother Lars Benzon in 1714 and sold Hagestedgaard to him in 1715. Willum Worm (1698-1737), a civil servant and poet, purchased Hagestedgaard from Lars Bentzon in 1725. He sold the estate to  Rachel Sophie Marschalk Fletscher in 1727.

1740–1769: The Seidelin  family
 
Hans Seidelin purchased Hagestedgård in 1730. A favourite of the new king Christian VI, he had just been appointed to Post Master-General of the Royal Danish Mail, Director of the Royal Vajsen House and judge at the Hofretten. The purchase of Hagestedgård emphasized his new position in society and he was ennobled the following year.

Seidelin's son, Hans Hansen Seidelin, who inherited Hagestedgård in 1740, had no male heirs. After his death, Hagestedgård  was therefore endowed to his nephew, Hans Diderik Brinck-Seidelin, with the intention to turn it into a stamhus (family trust) for future generations of the family. This happened when Brinck-Seidelin, in 1752, founded Stamhuset Hagested from the estates of Hagestedgaard, Holbæk Ladegård and Eriksholm. Hagestedgaards was, however, with royal approbation, already sold in 1769.

1769–present: The Castenschiold family
The new owner was Carl Adolph von Castenschiold. His son, Christian Ludvig Castenschiold sold Hagestedgaard to his cousin Casper Holten Grevencop-Castenschiold in 1825, due to economic difficulties.

His son of the same name (1809-1882), who inherited the estate in 1854, sold the tenant farms to the tenants on favourable conditions. He had one son and three daughters. One of the daughters, Severine Jacobine Grevencop-Castenschiold, married the prominent archaeologist  Jens Jacob Asmussen Worsaae. The couple did not own the estate but lived there for extended periods of time. Worsaae died there in 1885.

 
Grevencop-Castenschiold's widow, Cathrine Marie Louise Grevencop-Castenschiold, née Jensen, kept Hagestedgaard until 1901. The estate was then passed on to their son, Casper Holten Jens Peter Grevenkop-Castenskiold (1845-1937). His only child, Addie Grevenkop-Castenskiold (1878-1963), married Baron Wilhelm Lerche (1857-1916), a son of Count Vilhelm Cornelius Magnus Lerche of Birkendegaard, on 19 may 1908. She inherited Hagestedgaard in 1937. Her only child, Esther, Baroness Lerche, who had been born on the estate in 1909 (died 1986), married Frants Hvass (1896-1982), a diplomat, on 17 September 1949. She bought the Hagestedgaard estate from her mother in 1953. She passed  the estate on to their son Anders Michael Hvass om 1975. He was a chamberlain and Master of the Hunt (Hofjægermester).

Architecture
Most of the buildings seen today were built for Hans Didrik Brinck-Seidelin in 1748. It is an asymmetrical complex of single-storey, white-washed buildings surrounding a central courtyard. The buildings are built with timber framing on foundations of fieldstone and have roofs clad with winged, red tile.

The main wing is located on the west side of the courtyard and incorporates the remains of a tower and a barrel-vaulted cellar built by Johan Friis in 1555. The tower has a pyramid roof.

To the east of the central courtyard are two L-shaped residential wings surrounding an extra courtyard.

Two small pavilions with half-hip roofs are located on the north side of the central courtyard.

Today
The current owner is Henning Hvass. The estate covers 555 hectares of land of which 336 hectares are farmland, eng 84 hectares are pastures and 89 hectares are Forest.

List of owners
 (      -1540)   The Crown
 (1540-1570)   Johan Friis
 (1570-1586)   Frederik Friis
 (1570-1586)   Christian Friis
 (1586-      )    Henrik Huitfeldt
 (      -1663)    Henrik Thott
 (1663-1680)   Thomas Bartholin
 (1680-1686)   Caspar Bartholin
 (1686-1695)   Laurits Jacobsen
 (1695-1704)   Caspar Bartholin
 (1704-1709)   Ursula von Putbus
 (1709-1712)   Ole Bornemann
 (1712-1715)  Peder Benzon
 (1715-1725)   Lars Benzon
 (1725-1727)   Willum Worm
 (1727-1730)   Rachel Sophie Marschalk Fletscher
 (1730-1740)  Hans Seidelin
 (1740-1748)   Hans Hansen Seidelin
 (1748-1769)   Hans Diderik Brinck-Seidelin
 (1769-1818)   Carl Adolph von Castenschiold
 (1818-1825)   Christian Ludvig Castenschiold
 (1825-1854)   Casper Holten Grevencop-Castenschiold
 (1854-1880)   Casper Holten Grevencop-Castenschiold
 (1880-1901)   Cathrine Marie Louise Grevencop-Castenschiold, née Jensen      
 (1901-1937)   Caspar Holten Jens Peter Grevencop-Castenschiold
 (1937-1953)   Addie Cathrine Juliane Lerche, née Grevencop-Castenskiold
 (1953-1975)   Esther Hvass, née Lerche
 (1975-      )    Anders Michael Hvass
 (2012-present)    Henning Hvass

See also
 Tølløsegård

References

External links

 Hagestedgaard aerial view
 Source

Listed castles and manor houses in Denmark
Listed buildings and structures in Holbæk Municipality
Manor houses in Holbæk Municipality
Buildings and structures associated with the Friis family
Buildings and structures associated with the Bartholin family
Buildings and structures associated with the Benzon  family
Buildings and structures associated with the Castenschiold family
Buildings and structures associated with the Lerche family